Iğdırspor is a former football team of Iğdır, Turkey. 

They were founded in 1952 and played in the TFF Second League between 2001 and 2006. The club dissolved in 2014.

Kits
The clubs played in green and white kits.

Stadium
The team played at the 5000 capacity Iğdır Şehir Stadyumu.

League participations
TFF Second League:2001–2004
TFF Third League: 1990–1991, 1997–01, 2004–07
Turkish Regional Amateur League: 1952–90, 1991–97, 2007–2014

See also 
 Iğdır F.K.

References

External links
 

Football clubs in Turkey
Association football clubs established in 1952
1952 establishments in Turkey
Sport in Iğdır